Colonial Hills is a planned community in Worthington, Ohio. Colonial Hills may also refer to:

Places
Colonial Hills (East Point), a neighborhood in East Point, Georgia, USA
Colonial Hills, a neighborhood in Holiday, Florida
Colonial Hills, a place in Berks County, Pennsylvania 
Colonial Hills, a place in Mifflin County, Pennsylvania 
Colonial Hills, a neighborhood in southern Knoxville, Tennessee
Colonial Hills, a subdivision in Abilene, Texas
Colonial Hills Park, a park in Lincoln, Nebraska

Other uses
Colonial Hills Christian School, a private Christian school in the Georgia neighborhood
Colonial Hills Conference, a defunct high school athletic conference in New Jersey